Pacific Coach Lines (PCL) was a tour, and charter company operating in Vancouver, Victoria, and Whistler.

PCL was the official bus transportation service between Vancouver International Airport and Whistler Village, British Columbia, Canada until 12 December 2018 when the route was taken over and operated by YVR Skylynx.

Pacific Coach Lines mainly used Prevost coaches.

On 31 March 2019, the company ceased all operations.

References

External links 
 Pacific Coach Lines

Companies based in Vancouver
Defunct transport companies of Canada
Defunct intercity bus companies of Canada
Transport in British Columbia